A liquefied natural gas storage tank or LNG storage tank is a specialized type of storage tank used for the storage of Liquefied Natural Gas. LNG storage tanks can be found in ground, above ground or in LNG carriers. The common characteristic of LNG Storage tanks is the ability to store LNG at the very low temperature of -162 °C (-260 °F). LNG storage tanks have double containers, where the inner contains LNG and the outer container contains insulation materials. The most common tank type is the full containment tank. Tanks vary greatly in size, depending on usage.

In-ground LNG tanks are also used; these are lined or unlined tanks beneath ground level. The low temperature of the LNG freezes the soil and provides effective containment. The tank is sealed with an aluminium alloy roof at ground level. Historically there have been problems with some unlined tanks with the escape of LNG into fissures, the gradual expansion of extent of the frozen ground, and ice heave which have limited the operational capability of in-ground tanks. All piping connected to the LNG tanks, whether above ground or in-ground, are routed through the top of the vessel. This mitigates against loss of containment in the event off a piping breach. 

In LNG storage the pressure and temperature within the tank will continue to rise. LNG is a cryogen, and is kept in its liquid state at very low temperatures. The temperature within the tank will remain constant if the pressure is kept constant by allowing the boil off gas to escape from the tank. This is known as auto-refrigeration.

The world's largest above-ground tank (Delivered in 2000) is the 180 million liters full containment type for Osaka Gas Co., Ltd.
(2) The world's largest tank (Delivered in 2001) is the 200 million liters Membrane type for Toho Gas Co., Ltd.

See also 

 Liquefied natural gas terminal

References

Storage
Storage tanks